United Givers Fund is the name used by several current or historical joint charitable appeals in the United States. Many of these appeals later adopted the United Way name, sometimes in conjunction with a merger with another charitable appeal.

Fundraising groups currently operating in the United States (primarily in the southeastern United States) under the United Givers Fund name include Cochran-Bleckley United Givers Fund Inc. of Cochran, Georgia and United Givers Fund of Marshall County Inc. of Lewisburg, Tennessee.

References

Cochran-Bleckley United Givers Fund - About Your United Givers Fund Explains that the agency, once affiliated with United Way, now serves the rural community of Cochran, Georgia, located in Bleckley County.  The Cochran-Bleckley United Givers Fund, Inc. is a small town non-profit charity dedicated to improving the health and welfare of Bleckley County residents.
United Way of the Greater Clarksville Region, Inc. -  About Your United Way Explains that the agency was founded in 1956 as "United Givers' Fund of Clarksville and Montgomery County, Inc." and changed its name in 1985 to the United Way of Clarksville-Montgomery County, Inc.
United Way of North Rock County - About Your United Way Agency was founded in 1944 as the Community Chest and War Fund, renamed North Rock County United Givers Fund in 1956, and renamed United Way of North Rock County in 1972.
The Washington Post, Saturday, December 25, 2004; Page A28  - Editorial: United Way's Best Way Discusses the history of the United Way, including the former United Givers Fund.
Central Coast United Way of NSW Australia  -  About how the organisation was formed and the charities Central Coast United Ways support.
TaxExemptWorld.com - search for United Givers Fund

Charity fundraising
Social welfare charities based in the United States